James Corkery (27 June 1889 – 20 April 1964) was a Canadian long-distance runner. He competed in the marathon at the 1912 Summer Olympics.

References

1889 births
1964 deaths
Athletes (track and field) at the 1912 Summer Olympics
Canadian male long-distance runners
Canadian male marathon runners
Olympic track and field athletes of Canada
Track and field athletes from Ontario